Jim Walkup may refer to:

 Jim Walkup (left-handed pitcher) (1895–1990), American baseball pitcher
 Jim Walkup (right-handed pitcher) (1909–1997), American baseball pitcher